The men's bantamweight (−62 kilograms) event at the 2006 Asian Games took place on 9 December 2006 at Qatar SC Indoor Hall, Doha, Qatar.

Schedule
All times are Arabia Standard Time (UTC+03:00)

Results 
Legend
DQ — Won by disqualification
R — Won by referee stop contest

Final

Top half

Bottom half

References
Results

External links
Official website

Taekwondo at the 2006 Asian Games